Franz Kapus (April 12, 1909 in Zurich – March 4, 1981 in Zurich) was a Swiss bobsledder who competed in the 1950s. Competing in three Winter Olympics, he won the gold medal in the four-man event at Cortina d'Ampezzo in 1956.

Kapus also won four medals at the FIBT World Championships with one gold (Four-man: 1955) and three bronzes (Two-man: 1955, Four-man: 1950, 1951).

References
 Bobsleigh four-man Olympic medalists for 1924, 1932-56, and since 1964
 Bobsleigh two-man world championship medalists since 1931
 Bobsleigh four-man world championship medalists since 1930
 DatabaseOlympics.com profile
 Wallenchinsky, David. (1984). "Bobsled: Four-Man". In The Complete Book the Olympics: 1896-1980. New York: Penguin Books. pp. 558, 560-1.

1909 births
1981 deaths
Swiss male bobsledders
Bobsledders at the 1948 Winter Olympics
Bobsledders at the 1952 Winter Olympics
Bobsledders at the 1956 Winter Olympics
Olympic bobsledders of Switzerland
Olympic gold medalists for Switzerland
Olympic medalists in bobsleigh
Medalists at the 1956 Winter Olympics
Sportspeople from Zürich
20th-century Swiss people